Principled Distance is a new model of secularism given by Rajeev Bhargava. The separation of government institutions and persons mandated to represent the state from religious institutions and religious dignitaries. He says that Indian secularism did not erect a strict wall of separation, but proposed a 'principled distance' between religion and state. Moreover, by balancing the claims of individuals and religious communities, it never intended a bludgeoning privatization of religion. In India, secularism means equal treatment of all religions. Religion in India continues to assert its political authority in matters of personal law. The western model of secularism is criticized in India for being an outdated concept as Rajeev argued that since Western model was developed when society was more homogeneous but since in the era of globalization, society is becoming more heterogeneous therefore a new concept, suitable for the present situation, is needed. He even argued that since Europe itself is no more homogeneous hence West should also follow the principled distance model which on one hand respects the diversity and at the same time empowers the state to interfere in case of any discrimination in the name of religion.

Examples of Principled Distance

Article 29 & 30 in Constitution of India seeks a principled distance between minorities as well as majority to protect, preserve and propagate their cultural, linguistic and religious identity through establishment of cultural and education institutions.

The Haj subsidy is a subsidy given to Indian Muslim Hajj pilgrims by the Government of India. The program has its origins in British colonial era. In post-colonial era, the Nehru government expanded the program in 1959 with the Hajj Act. The subsidy and taxpayer funded arrangements initially applied to Muslim Indian pilgrims traveling for religious reasons to Saudi Arabia, Syria, Iraq, Iran and Jordan. Since 1973, pilgrims applying through the Haj Committee of India are offered a concessionary fare on Air India. The subsidy was withdrawn on January 16, 2018 as per the orders of the Supreme Court of India.

Central Wakf Council, India  is an Indian statutory body established in 1964 by the Government of India under Wakf Act, 1954 (now a sub section the Wakf Act, 1995) for the purpose of advising it on matters pertaining to working of the State Wakf Boards and proper administration of the Wakfs in the country. Wakf is a permanent dedication of movable or immovable properties for  religious, pious or charitable purposes as recognized by Muslim Law, given by philanthropists. The grant is known as mushrut-ul-khidmat, while a person making such dedication is known as Wakif.

On one hand there is All India Muslim Personal Law Board (AIMPLB), a non-government organisation constituted in 1973 to adopt suitable strategies for the protection and continued applicability of Muslim Personal Law in India, most importantly, the Muslim Personal Law (Shariat) Application Act of 1937, providing for the application of the Islamic Law Code of Shariat to Muslims in India in personal affairs. The Board presents itself as the leading body of Muslim opinion in India. A role for which it has been criticised as well as supported. But on the other hand, through judgement, Supreme Court of India allows Muslims to adapt child. The apex court said on Wednesday that the laws of land has to get primacy over personal law till the country achieves Uniform Civil Code as provided in Article 44 of the Constitution.

See also

References 

Age of Enlightenment
Atheism
Agnosticism
Freethought
Indian philosophy
Religion and politics
Philosophy of religion
Concepts in political philosophy
Secularism
Separation of church and state